Xaniar Khosravi (also Romanized as Zānyār Xosrawi; born 22 April 1985) is an Iranian singer. composer, lyricist and arranger. He officially published his album debut named 28 in early 2013.

Xaniar was born in Tehran, and is the younger brother of Sirvan Khosravi, who is a pop singer too.

He also appeared as an actor on two Iranian films by now, which one of them is Peyman Moaadi's directing debut The Snow on the pines. Also the other film is Love is not banned a film by Bijan Birang.

His first concert tickets were sold in less than two days, which was a motive for his continued work.

Discography

Albums 
 Twenty Eight (28)- 2013

Songs 

after me
darya
bezan baran
cheshmanat arezoost 
hatred (with maziar lashani)
my mood (with maziar lashani)
I'm not backing now (nemiram aghab)
you don't know (nemidooni)
70 million stars(70 millions setare)
risk
beside moonlight (kenare mahtab)
yes
she
i knew you were gonna go (midoonestam miri)
gravity (jazebe)
with out you (bedoone to)
hye you
dreamy eyes (cheshmaye royayi)
but I'll miss you (ama delam vasat tang mishe)
It went by fast (zood gozasht)
hypnotism
i still have hope (omid daram hanooz)
I'm not a millionaire]] (man millionaire nistam)
if you want (to age bekhay)
you became my world]] (to shodi hame donyam)
if you weren't here (to nabashi)
i dont want to change (man nemikham avaz besham)
rare feeling (hese kamyab)
you make me jealous (hasoodim mishe)
Cheraghaye Shahr

Music videos 

that's it
Do not dodge
Without you
risk
Life is all the same
I'm not a millionaire
gravity
If you stay (age mimoondi)
with out you (live)
i knew you were gonna go (midoonestam miri)
I'm not backing now (nemiram aghab)
Huh

Filmography 
The Snow on the pines- 2010
Love is not Closed – 2014
The Professional – 2021

See also
Sirvan Khosravi
 Persian pop music

References

Iranian composers
Living people
Singers from Tehran
Iranian male television actors
Iranian male film actors
Persian-language singers
21st-century Iranian male singers
Iranian male singers
Iranian pop singers
Iranian singer-songwriters
People from Tehran
1985 births
Iranian music arrangers
Iranian people of Kurdish descent